Vila Real is a city and municipality in northern Portugal.

Vila Real may also refer to:

Portugal
 S.C. Vila Real, an association football club from Vila Real
 Vila Real District with capital in Vila Real
 Vila Real Football Association, the governing body in the district of Vila Real
 Vila Real de Santo António, a town in Faro District, in the Algarve region of Portugal
 Vila Real (Olivença), a village in the disputed section of the Portugal—Spain border

Spain
 Vila-real or Villarreal, a municipality in the Valencian Community, Spain
 Vila Real (Olivença), a village in the disputed section of the Portugal—Spain border

Brazil
 Vila Real da Praia Grande, colonial designation of the city of Niterói, in Rio de Janeiro

See also
 Villarreal (disambiguation)
 Villa Real, a district within the City of Buenos Aires